The 12709 / 12710 Simhapuri Express is a Express train operated by South Central Railways of Indian Railways between Secunderabad and Gudur in Nellore district of Andhra Pradesh.

Route & Halts

Traction
Both trains are hauled by a Lallaguda based WAP-7 locomotive from end to end.

Rake sharing
The train shares its rake with 17057/17058 Devagiri Express.

Rakes
Luggage/Brake Van – 2, General or II class – 3, AC III Tier – 2, AC II Tier – 2, First Class cum AC II Tier – 1 and Sleeper Class – 14.

Image gallery

References

Transport in Secunderabad
Named passenger trains of India
Rail transport in Andhra Pradesh
Railway services introduced in 2005
Express trains in India
Rail transport in Telangana